Urophorus humeralis, known generally as the pineapple beetle or yellow-shouldered souring beetle, is a species of sap-feeding beetle in the family Nitidulidae. It is found in Africa, North America, Oceania, Southern Asia, Europe, and temperate Asia. The species is known to be a vector of Ceratocystis paradoxa in sugarcane in Hawaii, and the beetles are attracted to diseased sugarcane more than healthy sugarcane, with Ceratocystis paradoxa being more nutritious to U. humeralis larvae.

References

Further reading

External links

 

Nitidulidae
Articles created by Qbugbot
Beetles described in 1798
Cosmopolitan arthropods
Insect vectors of plant pathogens